Naringi is a genus of flowering plants belonging to the family Rutaceae.

Its native range is India to Indo-China.

Species
Species:
 Naringi crenulata (Roxb.) Nicolson

References

Aurantioideae
Aurantioideae genera